Captain Lash is 1929 American silent adventure drama film directed by John G. Blystone and starring Victor McLaglen, Claire Windsor and Jane Winton. It was produced and distributed by the Fox Film Corporation. A copy of the film exists at the UCLA  The film was released with a music score and sound effects track.

Plot
Lash is the head coal stoker on a steam ship whose shipmates have nicknamed "Captain". Lash somehow grabs the attention of society dame passenger Cora Nevins. Nevins is actually a jewel thief who's lifted diamonds from wealthy passenger Arthur Condrax. She needs Lash to aid in sneaking the "ice" ashore at Singapore. Cocky is Lash's concertina-playing buddy and uses it to signal Lash.

Cast

 Victor McLaglen as Captain Lash 
 Claire Windsor as Cora Nevins
 Jane Winton as Babe
 Clyde Cook as Cocky
 Arthur Stone as Gentleman Eddie 
 Albert Conti as Alex Condrax
 Jean Laverty as Queen
 Frank Hagney as Bull Hawks
 Boris Charsky as Condax's servant
 Marcelle Corday as Mrs. Koenig

References

External links
 
Movie review from New York Times February 4, 1929

1929 films
American silent feature films
Fox Film films
American adventure drama films
1920s adventure drama films
American black-and-white films
Films directed by John G. Blystone
1929 drama films
1920s American films
Silent American drama films
Silent adventure drama films